Commonwealth United Entertainment, formerly known as Television Enterprises Corporation and was also known as Commonwealth United Corporation after its parent corporation, was an American film production and distribution company active to 1971. It was headed by Milton T. Raynor.

The company was sometimes considered one of the "instant majors" of the late 1960s. The company also briefly operated a record label, Commonwealth United Records.

History
Commonwealth United Corporation was originally a real estate holding company formed in 1961 as the Real Properties Corporation.  It changed its name to CUC in 1965. In 1967, CUC acquired Television Enterprises Corporation (TVC). Milton T. Raynor moved to California and became vice-president at TVE.  Later, Raynor took over ownership.

Commonwealth United Entertainment
In 1967, Commonwealth United Corporation acquired The Landau-Unger Company, with Ely Landau becoming president and CEO and Oliver A. Unger as executive vice-president. It also acquired Television Enterprises Corporation and was renamed Commonwealth United Entertainment (CUE). In 1967, CUE produced 17 theatrical films and purchased publishing and recording interests. The Max Factor family financed That Cold Day in the Park, a movie directed by Robert Altman that CUE released in 1969. By 1971, CUE was $80 million in debt. The company's film rights, foreign and domestic, were acquired by National Telefilm Associates and American International Pictures.

Select Credits
A Black Veil for Lisa (1968)
99 Women (1969)
Venus in Furs (1969)
Battle of Neretva (1969)
The Magic Christian (1969)
It Takes All Kinds (1969)
That Cold Day in the Park (1969)
Tiger by the Tail (1970)
Julius Caesar (1970)
The Ballad of Tam Lin (1970)

References

Cook, David A. (2000). Lost Illusions: American Cinema in the Shadow of Watergate and Vietnam, 1970-1979. University of California Press.

External links
Commonwealth United Entertainment at IMDb

Film production companies of the United States
Film distributors of the United States
Paramount Global subsidiaries